Sørfold is a municipality in Nordland county, Norway. It is part of the  traditional district of Salten. The administrative centre of the municipality is the village of Straumen. Other villages in the municipality include Leirfjordgården, Mørsvikbotn, Røsvika, Rørstad, Styrkesvik, and Øvre Kvarv. The municipality surrounds the Sørfolda fjord and stretches east to the border with Sweden. 

The  municipality is the 48th largest by area out of the 356 municipalities in Norway. Sørfold is the 286th most populous municipality in Norway with a population of 1,869.

General information
The municipality of Sørfolden was established on 1 January 1887 when the old municipality of Folden was divided into two: Sørfolden (population: 1,946) and Nordfold-Kjerringøy (population: 1,347). The spelling was later changed to just Sørfold. On 1 January 1894, the Movik farm (population: 30) along the Sagfjorden was transferred from Nordfold-Kjerringøy municipality to Sørfold municipality.

During the 1960s, there were many municipal mergers across Norway due to the work of the Schei Committee. On 1 January 1964, the Øyjord area along the Nevelsfjorden (population: 81) was transferred to the neighboring municipality of Bodin. On the same date, the Mørsvikbotn area (population: 268) was transferred from Nordfold Municipality to Sørfold Municipality. On 1 January 1984, the Tårnvika and Øygården area (population: 22) along the Sørfolda fjord was transferred from Sørfold to Bodø Municipality.

Name
The municipality is named after the local Folda fjord. The first element is the prefix  which means "Southern". The inner part of the fjord is divided into two arms Nordfolda ("the northern Folda") and Sørfolda ("the southern Folda").

Coat of arms
The coat of arms was granted on 24 April 1987. The official blazon is "Azure, a turbine wheel argent". This means the arms have a blue field (background) and the charge is a turbine wheel for a hydroelectric power plant. The turbine has a tincture of argent which means it is commonly colored white, but if it is made out of metal, then silver is used. The blue color in the field and the turbine were chosen to symbolize the rivers around the municipality which contain many rapids and waterfalls. These are partly harnessed to generate electricity which has provided a major source of income for the municipality. The arms were designed by Arvid Sveen from Vadsø.

Churches
The Church of Norway has one parish within the municipality of Sørfold. It is part of the Salten prosti (deanery) in the Diocese of Sør-Hålogaland.

Geography

In 1987, only  of land was being actively farmed.

To the north of Sørfold is Hamarøy Municipality and to the south is Fauske Municipality. To the east, the Sørfold borders Jokkmokk Municipality in Sweden.

Rago National Park, with its wild nature dominated by bare rock, streams, and pine forest, is located in Sørfold. The glacier Blåmannsisen, one of the largest in Norway, is partly located in the municipality. There are several nature reserves.

There are many large lakes in Sørfold, including Andkjelvatnet, Faulvatnet, Forsvatnet, Grovatnet, Horndalsvatnet, Kobbvatnet, Kvitvatnet, Langvatnet, Leirvatnet, Litlverivatnet, Mørsvikvatnet, Nedre Veikvatnet, Røyrvatnet, Rundvatnet, Sildhopvatnet, Sisovatnet, Storskogvatnet, Straumvatnet, and Trollvatnet.

Government
All municipalities in Norway, including Sørfold, are responsible for primary education (through 10th grade), outpatient health services, senior citizen services, unemployment and other social services, zoning, economic development, and municipal roads. The municipality is governed by a municipal council of elected representatives, which in turn elect a mayor.  The municipality falls under the Salten District Court and the Hålogaland Court of Appeal.

Municipal council
The municipal council of Sørfold is made up of 17 representatives that are elected to four year terms. The party breakdown of the council is as follows:

Mayor
The mayors of Sørfold:

1887-1887: Lars J. Wormdahl (H)
1893–1896: Nils Lie (V)
1897–1899: Hans A. Pedersen (LL)
1899–1901: Einar Amlie (LL)
1902-1907: Henrik Brækkan (H)
1908-1920: Petter Skog (LL)
1920-1927: Søren Øigaard (LL)
1927-1935: Søren L. Ørnes (Bp)
1935-1940: Johan Abelsen (Ap)
1941-1945: Olaf Hestvik (NS)
1945-1945: Johan Abelsen (Ap)
1946-1951: Magnus Lilleeng (Ap)
1952-1963: Hilmar Hammerfall (Ap)
1964-1971: Ottar Vollan (Ap)
1972-1975: Edvin Didriksen (Ap)
1976-1995: Frantz Pettersen (Ap)
1995-2003: Jakob Jakobsen (Sp)
2003-2019: Lars Evjenth (Ap)
2019–present: Gisle Hansen (Sp)

History

The small village of Mørsvikbotn is located in the north part of the municipality. In this area, Mørsry, the German army had a prisoner-of-war camp during World War II housing mostly Russian POWs. They were building the Polarbanen railway, which was intended to be a link between Fauske and Narvik. Some ruins of the camp, the foundations of the railway line, a tunnel, and roads can still be observed.

Notable people 
 Alfred B. Skar (1896 in Sørfold – 1969) a newspaper editor, writer, trade unionist and politician 
 Eivind Tverbak (1897 in Sørfold – 1982) a Norwegian novelist and children's writer
 Oddmund Ingvald Jensen (1928 in Sørfold – 2011) a cross-country skier and coach, competed at the 1956 and 1960 Winter Olympics 
 Thor Helland (1936 in Sørfold – 2021) a 5000 metres runner, competed in the 1964 Summer Olympics

References

External links

Municipal fact sheet from Statistics Norway 

 
Municipalities of Nordland
Populated places of Arctic Norway
1887 establishments in Norway